Adel Nima (born 26 February 1970) is a coach and former international Iraqi football player. He played as a defender, he is currently working as a coach for Al-Sinaat Al-Kahrabaiya

Coaching career

Al-Hudood
On 24 July 2018, Nima signed for Al-Hudood SC for one season contract. The club wanted a mid-table finish in the Iraqi Premier League. Nima knew the goal and the team had a good first round with only 6 wins out of 18, the team was in mid-table. In the 2nd round, Al-Hudood SC had a very bad start and did not have many wins until the last fixtures which made Nima's team go for 9th place out of 20 with 50 points same as 7th and 8th places. Making one of the best finishes for the club. Nima did not renew his contract wanting to go for a new experiences.

Al-Sinaat Al-Kahrabaiya

On July 28, 2019, Nima was appointed as Al-Sinaat Al-Kahrabaiya manager with many new and big challenges.

Managerial statistics

Honors

Player
Al-Talaba
Iraqi Elite Cup: 1993, 1995
Asian Cup Winners' Cup: runner-up: 1995

Iraq national football team U-23
Nehru Cup: 1995
Pestabola Merdeka: 1995

Iraq national football team
Nehru Cup: 1997

As A Manager
Al-Hudood SC
 Iraq Division One: 2021–22

References

External links
 Profile on kooora.com 

1970 births
Living people
Sportspeople from Baghdad
Al-Naft SC players
Al-Talaba SC players
Iraqi footballers
Iraq international footballers
1996 AFC Asian Cup players
Association football fullbacks
Iraqi expatriate footballers
Expatriate footballers in the United Arab Emirates
Iraqi expatriate sportspeople in the United Arab Emirates
Iraqi football managers